TCS-1 (Transcaribbean System 1) was an optical submarine telephone cable.

It was installed in 1990, was 2,593km in length and had a capacity of 280 Mbit/s. Service was ended on 9 January 2004. It was owned and maintained by AT&T, MCI and Sprint

It had landing points in:
San Juan, Puerto Rico
Baranquilla, Colombia
Santo Domingo, Dominican R.
Kingston, Jamaica

See also
List of international submarine communications cables

References
Atlantic-Cable
ICPC-Caribbean Cables

External links 
http://www.our.org.jm/PDF-FILES/CPT200303.pdf

Submarine communications cables in the Caribbean Sea
Dominican Republic–United States relations
Colombia–United States relations
Jamaica–United States relations
1990 establishments in Puerto Rico
1990 establishments in Colombia
1990 establishments in Jamaica
1990 establishments in the Dominican Republic